San Regolo is a village in Tuscany, central Italy, administratively a frazione of the comune of Gaiole in Chianti, province of Siena. At the time of the 2001 census its population was 64.

Main sights
San Regolo (18th century), parish church of the village
Castello di Brolio

References 

Frazioni of Gaiole in Chianti